The North New Guinea languages of Papua New Guinea and Indonesia form a possible linkage of Western Oceanic languages. They have been in heavy contact with Papuan languages.

Classification
According to Lynch, Ross, & Crowley (2002), the structure of the family is as follows:

? Sarmi–Jayapura family
Schouten linkage
Huon Gulf family
Ngero–Vitiaz linkage

The center of dispersal was evidently near the Vitiaz Strait between New Britain and the New Guinea mainland.

The inclusion of Sarmi and Jayapura Bay is uncertain, and it may constitute a separate branch of Western Oceanic.

References

Ross, Malcolm (1988). Proto Oceanic and the Austronesian languages of western Melanesia. Canberra: Pacific Linguistics.

 
Western Oceanic languages 
Languages of Papua New Guinea
Languages of western New Guinea
Papua (province) culture